Patrick Joseph Boland (January 6, 1880 – May 18, 1942) was a United States representative for Pennsylvania 11th District.

Biography
Born in Scranton, Pennsylvania, to Irish immigrants, he attended St. Thomas College (now the University of Scranton). He worked as a carpenter and general contractor. He was on the Scranton city council from 1905 to 1906, the Board of education from 1907 to 1909. He then served as county commissioner of Lackawanna County from 1915 to 1919.

A Democrat, he was elected to the House of Representatives in 1930, serving until his death in 1942. From 1935, he served as the Majority Whip.

He was married twice, first to Sarah Jennings on November 24, 1908; after her death, he married Veronica Barrett on October 27, 1931. Barrett would serve out the rest of his term after he died.

He was a member of the Benevolent and Protective Order of Elks and of the Knights of Columbus.

A Roman Catholic, he was interred in the Cathedral Cemetery in Scranton.

See also
 List of United States Congress members who died in office (1900–49)

References
Democratic Whips — Office of the Clerk
Political Graveyard

Times-Tribune story on Boland

External links
 

American people of Irish descent
Politicians from Scranton, Pennsylvania
University of Scranton alumni
Pennsylvania city council members
1880 births
1942 deaths
School board members in Pennsylvania
Democratic Party members of the United States House of Representatives from Pennsylvania
20th-century American politicians

Lackawanna County Commissioners (Pennsylvania)